Al-Rahim Mosque or al-Raheem is the only mosque in Dubai Marina, Dubai, United Arab Emirates.

It is located near the southernmost point of Dubai Marina. It opened in October 2013.

History 

The mosque was built at the request of Sheikh Mansour bin Zayed Al Nahyan of Abu Dhabi, Deputy Prime Minister of the UAE. Its construction took 3-4 years. It has been open to the public since October 2013.

Architecture 

Rahim al-Masjid reflects the basic concepts of Islamic architecture. It includes a minaret from which the imam issues calls to prayer. The mosque is crowned by a single dome, a symbolic representation of the vault of heaven. It includes a ziyada, a patio surrounded by a double wall. The facade facing the marina is bordered by a waterfall. In the evening, the chamber is illuminated with white and blue colors. The mosque offers two speakers: the first consists mainly of the men's prayer room, whose entrance faces the patio. On the same floor is the (smaller) women's prayer room, whose entrance is oriented outwards. Across the floor, women can observe the prayer room for men below. Women have their own room with ablution with "high-tech" seating with motion detectors. The second enclosure comprises three rooms. The part facing the patio houses the hall of ablutions. The outward-facing side (almost like a partially-hidden annex) houses a Koranic school and a library devoted to Islamic studies, both on behalf of Sheikh Mansour bin Zayed Al Nahyan.

Activity 
The mosque can accommodate up to 2,000 people. It is crowded on Friday during the midday prayer in Arabic called adh-Dhuhr and during Islamic festivals such as the Eid. Masjid al-Rahim is primarily a place of prayer.

See also 
 Mosquée al-Rahim - Translation

References

Mosques in Dubai
Mosque buildings with domes
Mosques completed in 2013
2013 establishments in the United Arab Emirates